Dave or David Pearce may refer to:

Dave Pearce (born 1963), British dance DJ and record producer
Dave Pearce (footballer) (born 1959), English former footballer
Dave L. Pearce (1904–1984), Louisiana state representative and state agriculture commissioner
David Pearce (transhumanist), British transhumanist
David Pearce, musician with Flying Saucer Attack
David Pearce (economist) (1941–2005), pioneer of environmental economics
David Pearce (boxer) (1959–2000), Welsh former British heavyweight boxing champion
David Pearce (politician) (born 1960), Missouri politician
David D. Pearce (born 1950), U.S. ambassador to Greece
David Mark Pearce (born 1972), British guitarist
David Pearce (athlete), British athlete
 David Pearce (born c. 2000), designer of the reverse of the new (2017) 12-sided UK pound coin

See also
David Pierce (disambiguation)